Galium verum (lady's bedstraw or yellow bedstraw) is a herbaceous perennial plant of the family Rubiaceae. It is widespread across most of Europe, North Africa, and temperate Asia from Israel, Lebanon and Turkey to Japan and Kamchatka. It is naturalized in Tasmania, New Zealand, Canada, and the northern half of the United States. It is considered a noxious weed in some places.

This species is sometimes confused with Galium odoratum, a species with traditional culinary uses.

Uses
In medieval Europe, the dried plants were used to stuff mattresses, as the coumarin scent of the plants acts as a flea repellant. The flowers were also used to coagulate milk in cheese manufacture (which gives the plant its name, from the Greek word γάλα, gala 'milk') and, in Gloucestershire, to colour the cheese double Gloucester. 
The plant is also used to make red madder-like and yellow dyes.
In Denmark, the plant (known locally as ) is traditionally used to infuse spirits, making the uniquely Danish drink .

Mythology
Frigg was the goddess of married women, in Norse mythology. She helped women give birth to children, and as Scandinavians used the plant lady's bedstraw (Galium verum) as a sedative, they called it Frigg's grass.

In Romanian folklore, it is called sânziana and it is linked to the Sânziene fairies and their festival on June 24.

In Gaelic mythology, the hero Cú Chulainn, who suffered fits of rage during battle, would take a tea of this plant to calm his frenzy. The plant is known as lus chneas Chù-Chulainn 'the herb of Cú Chulainn's skin' in Scottish Gaelic, and in the 14th/15th centuries it occurred with the Irish name Bolad cneise con Culainn ‘the smell of Cú Chulainn’s skin’ (NLI G 11 182b2).

Subspecies
Many varietal and subspecific names have been proposed, but only four are currently (May 2014) recognized:

Galium verum subsp. asiaticum (Nakai) T.Yamaz - China, Korea, Japan, Russian Far East (Primorye)
Galium verum subsp. glabrescens Ehrend. - Iran, Iraq, Turkey, Syria
Galium verum subsp. verum - most of species range
Galium verum subsp. wirtgenii (F.W.Schultz) Oborny - Central and eastern Europe plus Western Siberia

Gallery

See also
 List of Lepidoptera that feed on Galium

References

External links

Line drawing from Flora of Pakistan
Photo of herbarium specimen at University of Missouri, collected in Missouri, Galium verum 
Plants for a Future
US Department of Agriculture plants profile
Botanical.com, a modern herbal by M. Grieve
NaturGate, Luontoportti, Helsinki, Lady's Bedstraw,  Galium verum
Emorsgate seeds, wild seeds of the UK, Galium verum – Lady's Bedstraw 
Herbal Encounter, Lady’s Bedstraw (Galium Verum) 
Minnesota Wildflowers
Wilde Planten in Nederland en Belgie, Geel walstro, Giel slyt, Lady's Bedstraw (Yellow Spring Bedstraw, Cheese Rennet, Fleaweed, Gallion, Ladys Bedstraw, Maidens Hair, Petty Mugget, Wirtgen's Bedstraw, Wirtgens Bedstraw), Gaillet jaune, Echtes Labkraut, Galium verum  
Altervista, Galium verum L. - Erba zolfina, Le piante e le erbe medicinali

verum
Flora of North Africa
Flora of Europe
Flora of Asia
Plants described in 1753
Taxa named by Carl Linnaeus